is the 18th major single by the Japanese idol group Cute, was released in Japan on April 18, 2012. It is Cute's first ballad single.

Background 
The abbreviated title for the song is "Kimi Chari". It was made so that it would not be necessary to repeat the entire title, "Kimi wa Jitensha Watashi wa Densha de Kitaku", every time it was mentioned.

Release information 
The single was released in seven versions: Regular Edition (catalog number EPCE-5870), and Limited Editions A, B, C, D, E, and F.  All versions except the Limited Edition A are CD-only. The Limited Edition A includes a DVD with a special version of the music video for the title song.  The Limited Editions B to F each contain an additional track, a solo version of the title song performed by a Cute's member.  All the limited editions are shipped sealed and include a serial-numbered entry card for the lottery to win a ticket to one of the single's launch events.

Composition 
According to Tsunku, Cute's musical producer and author of the song, "Kimi wa Jitensha Watashi wa Densha de Kitaku" is a rock ballad with very simple, yet powerful arrangement. The concept is simplicity. It is a band sound with piercing vocals and the guitar phrases and distorted organ sounds that stick into your mind.

Concerning the lyrics, in his blog Tsunku wrote that the girl who sings the song is worried as if she and the boy will never see each other again, but he thinks that they will certainly meet the next day at school.

Music video 
The music video for the title track was shot at the Ajigaura train station.  The video was published on Cute's official YouTube channel on March 13, 2012 (Japan Standard Time).  As Airi Suzuki noted, in the music video the band tried to reproduce the story told in the song's lyrics like in a TV drama.  There also were 30 additional versions of the music video produced. They were published one per day on Cute's YouTube channel, starting April 1.

Promotion 
The single's April 21 release event at Ikebukuro Sunshine City's Fountain Square featured baseball player Yu Darvish, who wore a baseball uniform with the number 18 instead of 11 (his number in Texas Rangers) to celebrate Cute's 18th single.

Cover versions 
The song "Kimi wa Jitensha Watashi wa Densha de Kitaku" was covered by the fellow Hello! Project group S/mileage on their single "Suki yo, Junjō Hankōki", which was released on August 22, 2012. The S/mileage version was used as a theme song in Kaidan Shin Mimibukuro Igyō, a movie starring S/mileage members that came out on August 11 in the same year.

Track listing

Bonus 
Sealed into all the limited editions:
 Event ticket lottery card with a serial number

Charts

References

External links 
 Tsunku's comments on the single - Tsunku's official blog
  - Hello! Project
  - Up-Front Works
 
 

2012 singles
Japanese-language songs
Cute (Japanese idol group) songs
Songs written by Tsunku
Song recordings produced by Tsunku
Zetima Records singles
Pop ballads
2012 songs
Angerme songs
Torch songs
2010s ballads